Bruce Arthur Blakeman (born October 2, 1955) is an American attorney and politician currently serving as the 10th County Executive of Nassau County, New York. He was elected in the 2021 election, defeating Democratic incumbent Laura Curran. He previously served as the commissioner for the New York-New Jersey Port Authority as well as a Nassau County legislator and Hempstead town councilman.

Early life and education 
Blakeman was born in Valley Stream, New York. He attended Valley Stream Central High School. He earned a Bachelor of Arts degree in political science and government from Arizona State University and a Juris Doctor from the California Western School of Law.

Early career

Bruce Blakeman was first elected to the Hempstead Town Council in 1993.

In 1993, federal district court judge Arthur D. Spatt ruled Nassau County's Board of Supervisors to be in violation of one man, one vote. The Board of Supervisors authorized the creation of the Nassau County Legislature as a successor to their body. Elections were held in November 1995, and Blakeman, at the time a Hempstead town Councilman, was elected to the first Legislative class to represent the 7th district. He was also elected the body's first presiding officer. The body took their seats on January 1, 1996.

In 1998, Blakeman was the Republican nominee for New York State Comptroller, he lost in the general election to incumbent Democrat Carl McCall.

During a particularly bad election year for Nassau County Republicans, Blakeman lost his seat in the Legislature in the election of November 1999 to Jeff Toback, and the Republicans lost the Majority.

In June 2001, Blakeman was appointed by Governor George Pataki as a commissioner of the Port Authority of New York and New Jersey. He held that position until 2009. He was a commissioner during the September 11th attacks.

In 2007, as a member of the law firm Abrams, Fensterman, Fensterman, Eisman, Greenberg, Formato & Einige, Blakeman brokered a deal with Canon Inc. to keep their headquarters on Long Island, and retain over 1,100 jobs for local residents. Canon was planning on moving out of state.

In 2010, Blakeman ran for United States Senate after Hillary Clinton resigned the seat to become U.S. secretary of state, which triggered a special election. Governor David Paterson appointed then-Representative Kirsten Gillibrand, who would win the Democratic nomination for the Special Election. Blakeman lost the Republican primary to former Congressman Joe DioGuardi. In 2014, Blakeman ran for the open 4th congressional district, after Democratic U.S. Representative Carolyn McCarthy announced her retirement. He won the Republican Nomination, and went head to head with Nassau County District Attorney Kathleen Rice, the Democratic nominee, in the general election. He lost 53%-47%.

Law Enforcement and Homeland Security

Bruce Blakeman served as vice-chairman of security for the Port Authority of New York and New Jersey from 2001-2009 overseeing security for the PATH commuter railway, interstate bridges and tunnels, airports, and seaports as well as the World Trade Center.

Blakeman holds a certificate in Homeland Security management from Long Island University.

Hempstead Town Councilman

In January 2015, Blakeman was appointed to the Hempstead Town Council, replacing James Darcy after previously serving on the Hempstead Town Council from 1993 to 1995.

In 2017, Blakeman joined fellow Republican councilwoman Erin King-Sweeney in endorsing Democratic challenger Laura Gillen in the race for Hempstead Town Supervisor. Gillen, who ran against incumbent Town Supervisor Republican Anthony Santino, went on to win the election, becoming the first Democratic Hempstead Town Supervisor in over 100 years.  Gillen named Blakeman Deputy Town Supervisor.

In 2019, Blakeman and King-Sweeney endorsed Republican Receiver of Taxes Donald X. Clavin Jr. against Democratic Town Supervisor Laura Gillen for Town Supervisor. Clavin went on to win against Gillen.

Blakeman was succeeded on the Hempstead town council by GOP Assemblywoman Melissa Miller.

Nassau County Executive 
In March 2021, Blakeman was chosen by Nassau Republicans to run against incumbent Democratic Nassau County Executive Laura Curran. He defeated her by 2,150 votes.

On September 19, 2022, Blakeman introduced his annual budget proposal. This proposal did not raise nor lower taxes, and added nearly 100 additional police and law enforcement jobs to the County payroll.

In the summer of 2022, amid multiple shark sightings on Long Island beaches, Blakeman swam in the Atlantic Ocean at Nickerson Beach to alleviate fears and demonstrate that the water was safe to swim in.

Blakeman also endorsed U.S. Congressman Lee Zeldin of Shirley for Governor of New York in the 2022 November General Election against incumbent Governor Kathy Hochul.

On January 11, 2023, County Executive Blakeman joined Nassau Republican Chairman Joseph Cairo and other elected officials to call for the resignation of Congressman George Santos. Blakeman pledged not to work with Santos; criticizing him for lying about his resume, and falsely claiming his grandparents died in the Holocaust.

COVID Mandates
Before taking office, Blakeman pledged to fight actions imposed by New York Governor Kathy Hochul addressing the COVID-19 Pandemic, such as the face mask mandate in public school districts and public places, including businesses. On January 6, 2022, he signed an executive order making masks optional. After a Nassau County Supreme Court Justice declared Governor Hochul's mask mandate unconstitutional, Blakeman pushed for all local mandates be made optional. However, the New York Court of Appeals stayed the ruling pending appeal. Blakeman also refused to support a vaccine mandate for county workers.

State Bail Reform Laws
After taking office, County Executive Blakeman signed an Executive Order directing the Nassau County PD to record the number of criminals being released under the Bail Reform law passed under former Governor Andrew Cuomo. He has since called for the repeal of such bail reform law, citing statistics showing over 9,000 Nassau criminals being released and committing new crimes once released, as well as the general uptick in middle-of-the-night robberies of people's vehicles.

Ukraine
During the 2022 Russian invasion of Ukraine, Blakeman helped conduct a rifle drive which resulted in the collection of 60 rifles for Ukraine. He also joined with local elected officials to call for the shuttering of Russian owned Nassau County compounds after Russian Forces invaded Ukraine.

County Events
On July 30, Blakeman held a "Nassau is Back" concert featuring Long Island Native Joan Jett that attracted a record 25,000 residents, and honored healthcare workers and first responders who served during the pandemic. The concert was held at Eisenhower Park and was meant to encourage more residents to come and visit the county and shop locally.

In May of 2022, Blakeman Honored Uniondale Native and UFC Bantamweight champion Aljamain Sterling by proclaiming a day in his honor. A full motorcade and ceremony at Uniondale High School was held to mark the occasion. 

In 2022, Blakeman held a Nassau County Thanksgiving celebration at the Nassau Veterans Memorial Coliseum, honoring Nassau County native, TikTok star and singer-songwriter Madison Beer.

Nassau Coliseum 
On January 12, 2023, Blakeman announced on social media that Las Vegas Sands entertainment company submitted a bid to lease the property of the Nassau Coliseum and construct an entertainment venue consisting of a casino, hotels, and outdoor community spaces. Since the announcement, parts of the local community surrounding the Coliseum has spoken out against it, citing a potential increase of traffic and congestion in the area.

Personal life

Blakeman is married to Segal Blakeman. He has one son, Arlen and two step children Ariel and Avi. Blakeman's first wife Nancy is the third wife of Beatles Paul McCartney. His father was Assemblyman Robert M. Blakeman. His mother Betty passed away in 1995. His brother is Brad Blakeman, who was the Deputy Assistant to President George W. Bush. Blakeman is the first Jewish Nassau County Executive.

Blakeman, who was serving as commissioner of the Port Authority at the time, was scheduled to have a breakfast meeting at Windows on the World, a restaurant atop the north tower on September 11, 2001. Due to a family commitment, he postponed the meeting, avoiding being in the World Trade Center during the September 11th attacks. His nephew, NYS Court Officer Tommy Jurgens, was killed in the line of duty on 9/11/2001 while assisting in the evacuation of Tower 2 of the World Trade Center. Blakeman provided a DNA sample to identify his nephew’s remains.

References

Nassau County Executives
New York (state) Republicans
Jewish American people in New York (state) politics
Living people
1955 births